Tongzhou may refer to:

Modern locations
Tongzhou District, Beijing, named after a historical prefecture
Tongzhou District, Nantong, Jiangsu, named after a historical prefecture
Tongzhou, Guizhou, town in and subdivision of Pingtang County, Guizhou

Historical locations
Tong Prefecture (Shaanxi), a prefecture between the 6th and 20th centuries in modern Shaanxi

See also
Tong (disambiguation)